Kim Ji-soo (born August 23, 1986) is a Korean minor league baseball player. He played for the Kiwoom Heroes from 2009 to 2010.

References

Kiwoom Heroes players
South Korean baseball players
KBO League infielders
1986 births
Living people